Sorhagenia fibigeri is a moth in the family Cosmopterigidae. It is found in Asia Minor.

Adults have been recorded from the beginning of July to mid July.

Etymology
The species is named for the person who discovered the species, Michael Fibiger.

References

Moths described in 2003
Chrysopeleiinae